Seo Bok is a 2021 South Korean sci-fi action film directed by Lee Yong-ju and starring Gong Yoo and Park Bo-gum. The film revolves around a former intelligence agent Gi-heon (Gong Yoo), who gets involved with the first human clone, Seo Bok (Park Bo-gum). Principal photography began in May 2019. The film with a production cost of 16.5 billion was anticipated to release in December 2020 but its release was postponed due to the resurgence of the COVID-19 pandemic. Finally the film was released simultaneously in theatres and via streaming media TVING on April 15, 2021. In Vietnam, this film premiered exclusively on iQiyi on April 22, 2021.

Synopsis
Min Gi-heon (Gong Yoo) is an ex-agent of the intelligence agency, and Seo Bok (Park Bo-gum) is the first human clone created through stem cell cloning and genetic engineering. He possesses the secret for eternal life. They get entangled in dangerous situations as several forces want to take control of Seo Bok.

Cast
 Gong Yoo as Min Gi-heon, a former intelligence agent who is tasked with ensuring the safe transportation of Seo Bok 
 Park Bo-gum as Seo Bok, the first human clone
 Jo Woo-jin as Chief Ahn, an agent of the Korea Intelligence Agency
 Park Byung-eun as Shin Hak-seon
 Jang Young-nam as Dr. Im Se-eun, director of the Institute
 Kim Jae-keon as Kim Cheon-oh
 Yeon Je-wook
 Kim Hong-pa
 Lee Eon-jung as Yoon Hyun-soo

Production

Development
The project was conceived in January 2017. Director Lee Yong-ju wrote the screenplay.

Casting
The film was announced with Park Bo-gum in the role of Seo Bok, which was confirmed in March 2019. In October 2018, Gong Yoo was confirmed to appear in the role of an intelligence agency agent. In April 2019, Jang Young-nam, Jo Woo-jin and Park Byung-eun were cast in supporting roles. Art director Lee Ha-jun joined the group in June 2019. The net production cost was about 16 billion won.

Filming
Principal photography began in May 2019, the filming took place mainly at the Jeonju film studio located in Jeonju. Location filming took place from mid-June to early August 2019 in Tongyeong. The film was wrapped up in October 2019 after nearly six months of filming.

Release
On October 21, 2020, distributor CJ Entertainment announced the film will be released in December, 2020. A first look at the film was released on October 23, 2020.
 A new poster of the film was released on November 9, 2020. The film was released theatrically and via streaming media TVING on April 15, 2021. According to the Korean film industry it is the first time that a Korean big budget film will be released at the same time in the theaters and Over-the-top media service.

The film was also selected for premiere at Brussels International Fantastic Film Festival 2021 held on April 6 to April 18, 2021.

Seo Bok was invited to Fantasia International Film Festival to screen the film. The three-week festival was held from August 5 to 25, 2021 in Montreal. The film was screened in the Canadian Premiere section on demand.

Reception

Box office
The film was released on April 15, 2021 on 1382 screens. It was the number 1 place at the Korean box office, on the opening day of its release, collecting 45,155 audiences. It remained at the number 1 place at the Korean box office, on the second day of its release, as 36,183 audiences viewed the film. It also took the total commutative audience to 82,895 persons. The decrease in the number of audience from 1st day was attributed to the simultaneous release on streaming media TVING. The film maintained its number 1 rank at Korean box office after 3rd day of its release. It was number 1 at the end of the opening weekend at South Korean box office with
210,210 cumulative admissions.

According to Korean Film Council data, it is in 13th place among all the Korean films released in the year 2021, with a gross of US$3.28 million and 385,409 admissions, .
 The system of KOBIS (Korean Box Office Information System) is managed by KOFIC.

Critical response

Going by Korean review aggregator Naver Movie Database, the film holds an approval rating of 8.42 from the audience.

Kim Seong-Hyun reviewing the film for YTN wrote that the predominant question asked by the characters in the film was about life and death. Seong-Hyun felt that the action in the film was unsatisfactory, but that didn't reflect on the performance of the star cast. Concluding the review Seong-Hyun said, "It is difficult to erase the thought that the actors' performance is somewhat regrettable to contain a long and repetitive message."

James Marsh writing for South China Morning Post rated the film with two out of five stars and called it a "..... quasi-philosophical melodrama masquerading as a futuristic action thriller." He opined that director Lee Yong-ju in spite of putting all hi-tech thrills and setting a stage for good brainy cinema, couldn't make it happen. He found the film slow and lengthy and felt that the "violent, effects-heavy climax" was tardy to be enjoyable. Concluding the review Marsh wrote, "Inevitably it is the all-too-familiar themes of mortality, family and corporate malfeasance that permeate to the surface as Lee defiantly steers his film headlong into a quagmire of ponderous, poorly articulated existential nonsense."

Bryan Tan writing for Yahoo! News rated the film with two and a half stars out of five. Praising the performance of Park Bo-gum, he wrote, "Seeing Park Bo Gum's compelling acting on the silver screen again really warmed the cockles of my heart." Tan concluded the review, "the over-the-top psychic CGI displays really got in the way of the bigger questions of how the first ever human clone should find his place in the world, without everyone trying to siphon his DNA for everlasting life."

Jeanmarie Tan writing for The New Paper rated the film with three stars out of five. She opined that the film touched on the question of philosophical and ethical immortality superficially. Praising the performances of Park Bo-gum and Gong Yoo, she wrote that  Park was effortless in switching countenance from childlike innocence to bestial rage. Concluding her writing up Tan penned, "Watching Seobok, a superbeing with powers of telekinesis, go all Dark Phoenix on his enemies is right up there with any X-Men movie."

References

External links
 
 
 
 
 
Seo Bok at iQiyi (Vietnam)

CJ Entertainment films
2020s Korean-language films
South Korean buddy films
South Korean action thriller films
South Korean action drama films
South Korean science fiction action films
South Korean science fiction drama films
South Korean science fiction thriller films
South Korean thriller drama films
Films about cloning
Films about telekinesis
Films about immortality
Films about the National Intelligence Service (South Korea)
Films postponed due to the COVID-19 pandemic
Films shot in South Korea
Films set in South Korea
Films set in Ulsan
TVING original films
2021 films
2021 science fiction action films
2020s English-language films